Zavidovo is a village (selo) in Tver Oblast, Russia; official residence place for the President of Russia.

Zavidovo may also refer to:
Zavidovo, Ryazan Oblast, a village (selo) in Ryazan Oblast, Russia
Zavidovo railway station, a railway station of the Oktyabrskaya Railway, Russia
Zavydovo, a village in Zakarpattia Oblast, Ukraine